Chestnut Hill station is a light rail station on the MBTA Green Line D branch, located off Hammond Street north of Massachusetts Route 9 in the Chestnut Hill neighborhood of Newton, Massachusetts. The station has two side platforms serving the line's two tracks. Chestnut Hill station is not accessible.

History

The Brookline Branch of the Boston and Worcester Railroad was extended west to Newton Upper Falls by the Charles River Branch Railroad in November 1852. Chestnut Hill was added as a flag stop by 1858. After 1886, loop service on the Highland branch was run via what is now the Framingham/Worcester Line and later the Needham Line. The final trains on the line ran on May 31, 1958. The line was converted to light rail by the M.T.A. and Chestnut Hill reopened on July 4, 1959, along with the rest of the line. The original stone station was torn down and replaced by a small wooden shelter on the inbound platform.

In 2019, the MBTA indicated that the four remaining non-accessible stops on the D branch were "Tier I" accessibility priorities. A preliminary design contract for accessibility modifications at the four stations was issued in February 2021. The station platforms will be raised and rebuilt, and a new accessible path to Hammond Road will be built. Design reached 75% in June 2022 and was completed late that year. Construction was expected to be advertised in February 2023 and begin midyear.

References

External links 

 MBTA - Chestnut Hill
 Google Maps Street View: Hammond Street stairs, Middlesex Road entrance

Green Line (MBTA) stations
Railway stations in Norfolk County, Massachusetts
Former Boston and Albany Railroad stations
Railway stations in the United States opened in 1959